The Rose Bowl series is a series of Women's One Day International cricket matches between Australia and New Zealand that has been running since February 1985. It was originally known as the Shell Rose Bowl; the name was changed to the Rose Bowl Series in 2001.

Until 2000, the tournament took place annually, with matches alternating between the two countries. However, since then the format has changed regularly. The most recent series, held in Australia, took place in late 2020 in Brisbane.

Australia has dominated the tournament, winning 22 series to New Zealand's three, and New Zealand have only won 4 of 36 matches in the 21st century. New Zealand's last series victory came in the 1998-99 cricket season, when they defeated Australia over three matches in Palmerston North in New Zealand. Their only series victory in Australia was achieved in 1987, when they won two of the three matches in Perth.

Results Summary

Series results

Notes
A. The 1988–89 series was part of the 1988 World Cup.
B. The 1991–92 series was part of a triangular series also including England, shared between England and Australia.
C. The 1994–95 series was part of the New Zealand Women's Centenary Tournament, a triangular tournament won by India.
D. The 2001–02 series was won by Australia on points, 14–2, where home wins were awarded two points and away wins three.
E. The 2002–03 series was part of the World Series of Women's Cricket, a four-team tournament also involving England and India. The final match of the series was the final of the tournament.

References

International women's cricket competitions in Australia
International women's cricket competitions in New Zealand
Women's One Day International cricket competitions